Undercurrents may refer to:

Undercurrents (magazine), a UK magazine of radical and alternative technology
Undercurrents (news), a UK alternative video news network
Undercurrents (TV series), a Canadian television newsmagazine
 Undercurrents, a novel by Ridley Pearson